Laurent Desclos is an electrical engineer with Ethertronics, Inc. in San Diego, California. He was named a Fellow of the Institute of Electrical and Electronics Engineers (IEEE) in 2015 for his development of cellphone antenna technology.

References 

Fellow Members of the IEEE
Living people
Year of birth missing (living people)
Place of birth missing (living people)
American electrical engineers